Parliamentary elections were held in Yugoslavia between 22 and 24 November 1953. Candidates backed by the LCY-dominated Socialist Alliance of Working People of Yugoslavia won every seat.

Background
A new electoral law was adopted in September 1953, introducing several reforms. Candidates no longer being nominated by the Socialist Alliance but could self-nominate with either the support of a voters' meeting or 200 signatures. It was also required that there be at least two candidates in each constituency. For the first time, paper ballots were used, with voters marking their ballot paper in closed booths.

The 282 deputies of the Federal Assembly included 116 from Serbia, 66 from Croatia, 48 from Bosnia and Herzegovina, 24 from Slovenia, 21 from Macedonia and 7 from Montenegro.

Results
With multiple candidates allowed, the elections saw some serious contests, with 14 non-Alliance candidates running in Macedonia, although two of them were withdrawn shortly before election day. However, candidates supported by the Alliance won in every seat and it was reported that Alliance candidates had received 95.3% of the vote, with voter turnout at 89%. Milovan Đilas received the highest vote share of any candidate (98.8%), with Josip Broz Tito receiving 97.7%.

After losing by a narrow margin, former diplomat  requested a recount. However, he was publicly admonished and threatened with legal action.

References

Yugoslavia
1953 in Yugoslavia
Elections in Yugoslavia
November 1953 events in Europe
One-party elections
Election and referendum articles with incomplete results